Pithecellobium johansenii is a species of plant in the family Fabaceae. It is found in Belize, Guatemala, and Honduras.

References

johansenii
Flora of Belize
Flora of Guatemala
Flora of Honduras
Endangered plants
Taxonomy articles created by Polbot